The 2023 European Short Track Speed Skating Championships were held from 13 to 15 January 2023 in Gdańsk, Poland.

Medal summary

Men

Women

Mixed

Participating nations

References

External links
Official website
Results
Results book

European Short Track Speed Skating Championships
European Championships
European Short Track Speed Skating Championships
International speed skating competitions hosted by Poland
Sports competitions in Gdańsk
European Short Track Speed Skating Championships